Ann Temkin (born December 26, 1959) is an American art curator, and currently the Marie-Josée and Henry Kravis Chief Curator of Painting and Sculpture at the Museum of Modern Art in New York.

Early life and education 
Temkin was born in Torrington, Connecticut, to father Dr. Abraham Temkin, a dentist, and mother Joann Temkin (née Bernstein).

In 1981, Temkin received an undergraduate degree from Harvard University. In 1984, she received a Ph.D in art history from Yale University.

Career 
After completing her doctorate Temkin became an assistant curator in the Department of Painting and Sculpture at MoMA in 1984. In 1987 she began working at the Philadelphia Museum of Art under director Anne d'Harnoncourt. After spending a year as Acting Curator, Temkin was named the Muriel and Philip Berman Curator of Modern and Contemporary Art in 1990. There, she worked on exhibitions including: Barnett Newman (2002), Alice Neel (2001), Constantin Brancusi (1995), and Thinking Is Form: The Drawings of Joseph Beuys (1994).   She commissioned new work by artists like Sherrie Levine, Rirkrit Tiravanija and Richard Hamilton for her "Museum Studies" series, which she herself created. Temkin was also responsible for the renovation to the modern and contemporary galleries at the Philadelphia Museum of Art.

In 2003, after working for 13 years at the Philadelphia Museum of Art, Ann Temkin returned to working in the painting and sculpture department at MoMA. Temkin was named the Marie Josée and Henry Kravis Chief Curator of Painting and Sculpture in 2008. She was the first woman to hold this position, considered the most prestigious in the field of modern art.

As the Chief Curator of Painting and Sculpture she was responsible for curating or co-curating exhibitions including: Picasso Sculpture (2015); Robert Gober: The Heart Is Not a Metaphor (2014), the artist's first American retrospective; Jasper Johns: Regrets (2014); Ileana Sonnabend: Ambassador for the New (2013); Ellsworth Kelly: Chatham Series (2013); Claes Oldenburg: The Street and The Store and Mouse Museum/Ray Gun Wing (2013); Abstract Expressionist New York (2010); Gabriel Orozco (2009); and Color Chart: Reinventing Color, 1950 to Today (2008). In August 2013, she delivered a lecture at Torrington's Five Points Gallery.

In order to address the lack of expertise in African American art at MoMA, Temkin hired African American art history specialist Darby English as consulting curator. He aims to expand MoMa's acquisitions in the area. She is still MoMA's chief curator of painting and sculpture.

Personal life 
In 1998, Temkin married American biophysicist and University professor, Wayne Hendrickson.

Works and publications 
Temkin is the author or co-author of several books, including: 
 Temkin, Ann. Thinking is Form: The Drawings of Joseph Beuys. Philadelphia: Philadelphia Museum of Art, 1993. 
 Garrels, Gary, Ann Temkin, Richard Flood, and Robert Gober. Robert Gober: Sculpture and Drawing. Minneapolis: Walker Art Center, 1999.
 Temkin, Ann, ed. Alice Neel. Philadelphia: Philadelphia Museum of Art, 2000.
 Temkin, Ann. Twentieth Century Painting and Sculpture in the Philadelphia Museum of Art. 2nd ed. Philadelphia: Philadelphia Museum of Art, 2001.
 Temkin, Ann, ed. Barnett Newman. Philadelphia: Philadelphia Museum of Art, 2002.
 Brennan, Marcia, Alfred Pacquement, and Ann Temkin. A Modern Patronage: De Menil Gifts to American and European Museums. New Haven: The Menil Collection - Yale University Press, 2007. 
 Temkin, Ann, Anne Byrd, Benjamin H. D. Buchloh, Briony Fer, and Paulina Pobocha. Gabriel Orozco. New York: The Museum of Modern Art, New York, 2009. 
 Temkin, Ann. Claude Monet: Water Lilies (MoMA Artist Series). New York: The Museum of Modern Art, New York, 2009.
 Temkin, Ann. MoMA Masterpieces: Painting and Sculpture. New York: Thames & Hudson Ltd, 2009.
 Temkin, Ann. The Scream: Edvard Munch. New York: The Museum of Modern Art, New York, 2012.
 Temkin, Ann and Christophe Cherix. Jasper Johns: Regrets. New York: The Museum of Modern Art, New York, 2014.
 Temkin, Ann and Anne Umland, eds. Picasso Sculpture. New York: The Museum of Modern Art, New York, 2015.
 Tempkin, Ann, ed. Painting and Sculpture at The Museum of Modern Art. New York: The Museum of Modern Art, New York, 2015.

Awards 
 2010: Moore College of Art and Design, Visionary Woman Awards
 2012: New York University Institute of Fine Arts, Honorary Fellowship

References

External links 
 Ann Temkin at Museum of Modern Art 
 Marcel Duchamp | HOW TO SEE "Readymades" with MoMA curator Ann Temkin
 Ann Temkin and Abbi Jacobson discuss Marcel Duchamp's Bicycle Wheel, A Piece of Work podcast, WNYC Studios/MoMA

American art curators
American women curators
Women art historians
American art historians
Living people
Harvard University alumni
Yale University alumni
People associated with the Philadelphia Museum of Art
1959 births
American women historians
21st-century American women